Égly is a commune in the Essonne department in Île-de-France in northern France around 30 km (20 miles) south of Paris.

Population
Inhabitants of Égly are known as Aglatiens in French.

See also
Communes of the Essonne department

References

External links

Official website 

Mayors of Essonne Association 

Communes of Essonne